Free range is a method of farming and animal husbandry.

Free range may refer to:

 Free Range Graphics, film studio
 Free Range Studios, film studio
 Free Range (film), a 2013 Estonian film
 Free Ranger, an air character from Skylanders: Swap Force
 "Free Range", a 1992 song by The Fall

See also
 Free range eggs
 Free-range parenting
 Free roam (disambiguation)